Kuyganyor (also spelled as Kuyganyar) is an urban-type settlement in Andijan Region, Uzbekistan. It is the administrative center of Andijan District. The town population was 8,426 people in 1989, and 12,200 in 2016.

References

Populated places in Andijan Region
Urban-type settlements in Uzbekistan